Maan Sultan Al-Khodari (Arabic: معن سلطان الخضري, born 13 December 1991) is a Saudi professional footballer who plays for Muhayil as a defensive midfielder. On 4 August, his first game in 2012–13 season, he got injured at a cruciate ligament. That kept him away for 4 months.

Career statistics

Club

Honours

National team career statistics
2011 FIFA U-20 World Cup: Round of 16

References

1991 births
Living people
Ittihad FC players
Al-Raed FC players
Najran SC players
Al Batin FC players
Al-Shoulla FC players
Al-Suqoor FC players
Muhayil Club players
Sportspeople from Jeddah
Saudi Arabia youth international footballers
Saudi Arabian footballers
Saudi Professional League players
Saudi First Division League players
Saudi Fourth Division players
Saudi Third Division players
Association football midfielders